Glenmark, Eriksson, Strömstedt is the debut studio album by the Swedish supergroup Glenmark Eriksson Strömstedt. Produced by Anders Glenmark, it was released on Warner's Metronome label on 20 January 1995 in Sweden.

Track listing 

All songs written by Glenmark Eriksson Strömstedt.

Personnel 

GES

 Anders Glenmark – lead vocals, guitar
 Orup – lead vocals, guitar
 Niklas Strömstedt – lead vocals, guitar

Charts

References

External links 

 

1995 debut albums
Glenmark Eriksson Strömstedt albums
Warner Music Group albums